Paranatinga is a municipality in the state of Mato Grosso in the Central-West Region of Brazil.

The municipality contains the  Culuene Biological Reserve, created in 1898.

As of 2021, people are creating a new municipality out of the northern parts of Paranatinga to be called "Santiago do Norte".

See also
List of municipalities in Mato Grosso

References

Municipalities in Mato Grosso